Phoenix Children's Hospital is a freestanding pediatric acute care children's hospital located in Phoenix, Arizona. The hospital has 457 pediatric beds and is affiliated with the University of Arizona College of Medicine – Phoenix. Phoenix Children's also partners with Valleywise Health (formerly the Maricopa Integrated Health System) for a 3-year pediatric residency training program. The hospital provides comprehensive pediatric specialties and subspecialties including inpatient, outpatient, emergency, trauma, and urgent care to infants, children, teens, and young adults 0–21 throughout Arizona and the surrounding states. The hospital sometimes also treats older adults that require pediatric care. Phoenix Children's Hospital also features a Level 1 Pediatric Trauma Center, the only in the state. 

The hospital is one facility within Phoenix Children's statewide pediatric health system. Additional locations include Phoenix Children's Hospital–East Valley at Dignity Health Mercy Gilbert Medical Center, four pediatric specialty and urgent care centers, 11 community pediatric practices, 20 outpatient clinics, two ambulatory surgery centers and seven community-service-related outpatient clinics. Phoenix Children's Care Network includes more than 1,175 pediatric primary care providers and specialists who deliver care across more than 75 subspecialties.

History
Phoenix Children's Hospital was founded in July 1980 with the idea to provide pediatric care for the region. The hospital officially opened in 1983 as an independent children's hospital that was physically located within Good Samaritan Hospital. With 124 dedicated pediatric beds, it operated there for nearly 20 years. In September 1985 the hospital performed the first pediatric liver transplant in Arizona. A year later the hospital expanded to take over all of Good Samaritan's pediatric services adding 24 beds with the acquisition, again expanding in 1993 adding another 24 beds for a total of 172 pediatric beds.

In 1999, the hospital purchased a 22-acre plot that was originally occupied by the Phoenix Regional Medical Center for construction of a new freestanding children's hospital. In September 2000, demolition of the old hospital began to make way for the construction on a new freestanding hospital to cope with the large increase in demand for pediatric care.

Phoenix Children's opened as Arizona's only freestanding specialized pediatric hospital in May 2002 with 230 pediatric beds, and the only pediatric emergency department in Arizona.

In spring 2008, the hospital opened a new $23 million Neonatal Intensive Care Unit (NICU), which was one of the largest of its kind in the country.

In 2011, an 11-story tower was opened as the centerpiece of a 37-acre campus including the original East Building, two medical office buildings, a Central Energy Plant, three parking structures, an administration building and a Ronald McDonald House.

In 2016, Phoenix Children's was designated by the Arizona Department of Health Services as the only pediatric Advanced Life Support (ALS) Base Hospital in the state.

In 2017 Phoenix Children's unveiled a new $40 million, 42,300 square foot, 75-room Emergency Department, and nine bay Level 1 Trauma facility to allow more children to be seen more efficiently.

In the spring of 2021, a building collaboration between Dignity Health and Phoenix Children's will be opening on the campus of Mercy Gilbert Medical Center. The new building will be named the Women's and Children's Pavilion and feature a 60-bed Level III NICU, 24 bed pediatric inpatient unit, 24 bed pediatric emergency department, 18 pre-op rooms, 6 operating rooms, and 12 Post-Anesthesia Care Units.

In March 2021, Phoenix Children's announced the building of a freestanding emergency department and specialty clinic in Avondale, Arizona, providing West Valley families convenient access to top-ranked care.

In May 2021, Phoenix Children's announced the building of a freestanding, 3-story hospital in Glendale, Arizona, which will offer inpatient care, an emergency department, an outpatient surgery center and a multi-specialty clinic.   

In February 2022, Phoenix Children's became a founding partner and official healthcare provider at Bell Bank Park, a $280 million multi-purpose sports and entertainment complex in southeast Mesa, Arizona. Phoenix Children's is opening a 3,915-square-foot facility to offer sports medicine and urgent care at the park.

Services
In 2013, Modern Healthcare listed Phoenix Children's as one of the largest children's hospitals in the country. Phoenix Children's employs more than 220 pediatric specialists with more than 1,000 pediatric specialists on its Medical Staff and more than 1,000 FTEs on its nursing staff. This represents the largest pediatric group in the state of Arizona. The hospital also works in collaboration with Dignity Health and Mayo Clinic to provide more robust care in specialties related to cardiology, neurology, hematology/oncology and organ transplant.

The hospital has six Centers of Excellence: Barrow Neurological Institute at Phoenix Children's Hospital, Phoenix Children's Heart Center, Center for Pediatric Orthopedics, Center for Cancer and Blood Disorders, Level One Pediatric Trauma Center, and the Neonatal Intensive Care Unit.

Barrow Neurological Institute 
The Barrow Neurological Institute at Phoenix Children's hospital, also called Barrow at Phoenix Children's, is the neurological and neurosurgery Center of Excellence at Phoenix Children's Hospital in Phoenix, Arizona. It is one of six Centers of Excellence at the hospital. The institute is located on the main campus of Phoenix Children's Hospital with satellite clinics across central Arizona.

Barrow at Phoenix Children's offers comprehensive inpatient and outpatient neurological care and services to infants, children, and teens with neurological-related problems. It performs treatment, education, and research and is the largest pediatric neuroscience center in the Southwest. The institute is led by neurosurgeon P. David Adelson, MD.

As part of Phoenix Children's Hospital, Barrow at Phoenix Children's is also affiliated with the University of Arizona College of Medicine-Phoenix, providing the pediatric training for medical students there. Phoenix Children's partners with Maricopa Integrated Health System for a combined medical/pediatric residency program.

Each year, Barrow at Phoenix Children's hosts a number of educational conferences and opportunities for medical professionals, including an annual Children's Neuroscience Symposium and weekly Grand Rounds. The Division of Developmental Pediatrics trains physicians to diagnose autism in children through the Early Access to Care – AZ Program, which increases the accessibility of services for children with autism and other developmental disorders.

Awards
Phoenix Children's is rated by U.S. News & World Report as a Best Children's Hospital and is ranked in 8 specialties listed by the report. It was also named among the 2021 Healthiest 100 Workplaces in America by Healthiest Employers.

Phoenix Children's recently achieved accreditation as an Adult Congenital Heart Disease (ACHD) Comprehensive Care Center from the Adult Congenital Heart Association (ACHA), a nationwide organization dedicated to education, advocacy and research to improve the lives of those born with heart defects.

Ownership/leadership
Children's Healthcare of Arizona, Inc., an Arizona 501(c)(3) non-profit corporation, is the parent holding corporation for the majority voting member interest in Phoenix Children's Hospital. It manages the majority voting member interest in Phoenix Children's Hospital and provides strategic planning, policy and oversight functions.

Phoenix Children's is also an independent, Arizona 501(c)(3) non-profit organization, governed by a community board of directors.

Robert L. Meyer has served as president and CEO since 2002. He provides leadership over the organization's three major divisions.

See also
 List of children's hospitals in the United States

References

External links
 Official site

Children's hospitals in the United States
Hospitals in Arizona
Hospitals established in 1983
Pediatric trauma centers
Hospital buildings completed in 2002
Hospital buildings completed in 2011